(born August 10, 1982) is a Japanese professional wrestler. He currently wrestles in Michinoku Pro Wrestling, where he is the reigning Tohoku Junior Heavyweight Champion in his first reign. He is also a former two-time Tohoku Tag Team Champion and one-time UWA World Tag Team Champion.

Professional wrestling career
Nohashi, the smallest Último Dragón Gym trainee ever, made his pro wrestling debut in Toryumon Mexico in 2002 under the name of Koichiro Arai, Kenichiro Arai's (kayfabe) little brother. Koichiro teamed with Kenichiro and later with Chuichiro, the third brother, and wrestled in Toryumon Mexico and Toryumon X until 2004, when he changed his name to Shinjitsu Nohashi, the mini version of Jinsei Shinzaki.

After closing Toryumon X, Nohashi and his class were moved to Michinoku Pro Wrestling, where he formed a tag team with Shinzaki. On February 13, 2010 he turned heel and adopted his real name, Taro Nohashi, joining Fujita Hayato and his Kowloon stable.

Championships and accomplishments
Kyushu Pro-Wrestling
Glocal Tag Tournament (2021) – with Gaina
Michinoku Pro Wrestling
Tohoku Junior Heavyweight Championship (1 time)
Tohoku Tag Team Championship (2 times) – with Behnam Ali/Tiger Ali (1), Gaina (1)
UWA World Tag Team Championship (1 time) – with Gaina
Oogamania Cup (2008)
Pro Wrestling Illustrated
PWI ranked him #326 of the top 500 singles wrestlers in the PWI 500 in 2006

References

1982 births
Japanese male professional wrestlers
Living people
Masked wrestlers
21st-century professional wrestlers
Tohoku Junior Heavyweight Champions
Tohoku Tag Team Champions
UWA World Tag Team Champions